Vladislav Palša (born 8 October 1981 in Bardejov) is a retired Slovak football defender.

References

External links
at partizanbj.sk

1981 births
Living people
Slovak footballers
Association football defenders
AS Trenčín players
1. FC Tatran Prešov players
FK Dukla Banská Bystrica players
Czech First League players
SK Kladno players
FK Ústí nad Labem players
FK Dukla Prague players
Slovak Super Liga players
Partizán Bardejov players
FK Poprad players
People from Bardejov
Sportspeople from the Prešov Region
2. Liga (Slovakia) players